The 1927 West Virginia Mountaineers football team was an American football team that represented West Virginia University as an independent during the 1927 college football season. In its third season under head coach Ira Rodgers, the team compiled a 2–4–3 record and was outscored by a total of 129 to 68. The team played its home games at Mountaineer Field in Morgantown, West Virginia. Winchester Latham was the team captain.

Schedule

References

West Virginia
West Virginia Mountaineers football seasons
West Virginia Mountaineers football